Carlow County Council is the authority responsible for local government in County Carlow, Ireland. As a county council, it is governed by the Local Government Act 2001. The council is responsible for housing and community, roads and transportation, urban planning and development, amenity and culture, and environment. The council has 18 elected members. Elections are held every five years and are by single transferable vote. The head of the council has the title of Cathaoirleach (Chairperson). The county administration is headed by a Chief Executive, Kathleen Holohan. The county town is Carlow.

History
Originally Carlow Courthouse was the meeting place of Carlow County Council. The county council established their County Secretary's Office at 1 Athy Road in the former offices and printing works of the Carlow Sentinel which ceased publication after the First World War. The county council subsequently moved further north along Athy Road into modern premises which are now known as the County Buildings.

Local Electoral Areas and Municipal Districts
Carlow County Council is divided into the following municipal districts, each of which comprises a single local electoral area, defined by electoral divisions.

Current Councillors
The following were elected at the 2019 Carlow County Council election.

Councillors by electoral area
This list reflects the order in which councillors were elected on 24 May 2019.

Notes

References

External links

Politics of County Carlow
County councils in the Republic of Ireland